WCMS may refer to:

Web content management system
Western CUNA Management School, U.S.
WCMS-FM, an FM radio station located in Hatteras, North Carolina, U.S.
West Collierville Middle School, in Collierville, Tennessee, U.S.